In topology, a branch of mathematics, a manifold M may be decomposed or split by writing M as a combination of smaller pieces. When doing so, one must specify both what those pieces are and how they are put together to form M.

Manifold decomposition works in two directions: one can start with the smaller pieces and build up a manifold, or start with a large manifold and decompose it. The latter has proven a very useful way to study manifolds: without tools like decomposition, it is sometimes very hard to understand a manifold. In particular, it has been useful in attempts to classify 3-manifolds and also in proving the higher-dimensional Poincaré conjecture.

The table below is a summary of the various manifold-decomposition techniques. The column labeled "M" indicates what kind of manifold can be decomposed; the column labeled "How it is decomposed" indicates how, starting with a manifold, one can decompose it into smaller pieces; the column labeled "The pieces" indicates what the pieces can be; and the column labeled "How they are combined" indicates how the smaller pieces are combined to make the large manifold.

See also
 Surgery theory

Geometric topology